Hansjörg Pauli (3 March 1931 in Winterthur, Switzerland – 15 February 2007) was a Swiss musicologist, writer, and music critic. He was a pupil of Hans Keller.

During the 1950s, Pauli was a jazz pianist and a music critic for Neues Winterthurer Tageblatt.

From 1960 to 1965 Pauli worked at Radio Zürich on new music broadcasts, and between 1965 and 1968 he was a music editor for NDR-Fernsehen where he directed TV documentaries and produced films by Richard Leacock, Rolf Liebermann, Klaus Wildenhahn and others. Since 1968 he is a freelance writer.

Pauli is a prominent authority on the music of Luigi Nono.

Articles by Hansjörg Pauli
 'On Strawinsky's Threni''', Tempo, New Series, No. 49 (Autumn, 1958), pp. 16–17+21-33
 'Hans Werner Henze's Italian Music', The Score, No.25, June 1959
 'Für wen komponieren Sie eigentlich?' Reihe Fischer, vol. F 16''. Frankfurt am Main: Fischer, 1971.
 'Bernard Herrmanns Musik zu Citizen Kane', Dissonance 26 (November 1990): 12–18.

References

1931 births
2007 deaths
Swiss musicologists
20th-century musicologists